Akule may refer to:
Akule, a dialect of the Yendang language
Akule, the Hawaiian name for Bigeye scad